The 1978 NCAA Division III baseball tournament was played at the end of the 1978 NCAA Division III baseball season to determine the third national champion of college baseball at the NCAA Division III level. The tournament concluded with four teams competing at Pioneer Park in Marietta, Ohio, for the championship. Four regional tournaments were held to determine the participants in the World Series. Regional tournaments were contested in double-elimination format, with all four regions consisting of six teams, for a total of 24 teams participating in the tournament, up from 22 in 1977.

Bids
The 24 competing teams were:

Regionals

Bold indicates winner.

South Regional

West Regional

Northeast Regional

Mideast Regional

World Series

Participants

Bracket
Pioneer Park-Marietta, OH (Host: Marietta College)

See also
 1978 NCAA Division I baseball tournament
 1978 NCAA Division II baseball tournament
 1978 NAIA World Series

References

Tournament
NCAA Division III Baseball Tournament